Inga Lísa Middleton (born December 9, 1964) is an Icelandic photographer / film maker recently specialising in producing her photographs as cyanotype prints. She has also directed several films, such as the anthology Comedy drama Dramarama, and the short film Búi, which won the short film award at the SCHLINGEL International Film Festival. Her photographs have gone on to be shown in Iceand, Denmark, Japan and the United Kingdom.

Education 
Inga Lísa Middleton was born in Reykjavík, Iceland and performed her Icelandic University Entrance Exam at Menntaskólinn við Sund. Moving from Iceland to the United Kingdom in 1985, she gained an art foundation diploma after studying a year course at Sunderland Polytechnic. Middleton then enrolled at West Surrey College of Art and Design, Farnham, where she studied for three years and graduated with a BA(Hons) degree in photography, film/video and animation. It was during this time where she created her first animated short film, Mommy, Daddy, Bobby and Debby, of which was sold off to the British television channel, Channel 4.

After university, she went on to complete a two-year postgraduate course at the Royal College of Art in London, England. Here, in 1992, she graduated with MA (RCA) degree in visual communication. It would be the same year that Middleton would go on to direct and write the animated short film A Fairy Tale of Our Time. The short reached critical acclaim and was later nominated for best short film at the 46th annual Cannes Film Festival.

Photography 
In 2017, Middleton showed off her first photograph exhibition, titled Thoughts of Home; a series of cyanotype prints documenting the wildlife and natural environments of Iceland. The project was first shown off at the Icelandic Embassy in Copenhagen, Denmark, and the National Museum of Iceland in Reykjavík, Iceland. One year later, Thoughts of Home, went on to be exhibited at the Icelandic Embassy in London, England, and at the annual Photo London event, held inside Sommerset House, London. Middleton notes her inspiration for Thoughts of Home as being, both, her nostalgia for growing up in Iceland, while also the pairing of the beauty in nature and practical efficient undertones. 2018 also saw the reveal of Middleton's second art project, Tip of the Iceburg; cyanotype prints of icebergs, with only the iceberg's tip not submerged under water.

Phytoplankton, her most recent project, was first revealed at Photo London, in 2019. Middleton was inspired to pursue this project was by through how unicellular organisms, known as phytoplankton, are being destroyed by microplastics, even though they are vital to keeping the humans alive by producing the majority of the atmosphere's oxygen. She has also gone on record as being influenced by the work of Carl Jung, specifically his book Man and His Symbols. The works has been shown at PhotoLondon 2019 and at the Icelandic Embassy in Tokyo, Japan.

Filmography

Exhibitions 

 Thoughts of Home (2017) – Embassy of Iceland – Copenhagen, Denmark
 Thoughts of Home (2017) – National Museum of Iceland – Reykjavik, Iceland
 Thoughts of Home (2018) – Embassy of Iceland – London, United Kingdom
 Tip of the Iceburg & Thoughts of Home (2018) – London, United Kingdom
 Tip of the Iceburg & Thoughts of Home (2018) – London, United Kingdom
 Phytoplankton (2019) – Photo London – London, United Kingdom
 Megaptera (2021) – Photo London – London, United Kingdom
 Phytoplankton (2021-22) – Embassy of Iceland – Tokyo, Japan

Notes
a.Filmography gathered from the Icelandic Film Centre

References

1964 births
Living people
20th-century Icelandic women artists
21st-century Icelandic women artists
20th-century women photographers
21st-century women photographers
Alumni of the Royal College of Art
Alumni of the University of Sunderland
Icelandic film directors
Icelandic photographers
People from Reykjavík